The Capture of Bayburt occurred in 1514 when Selim I ordered Bıyıklı Mehmed Pasha to undertake the conquest of Bayburt.

After Selim I had departed from Edirne to launch his expedition against Shah Ismail he reached a place called Gök-Seki near Kemah. The Ottoman army waited in this vicinity for more than a week for grain which was being transported from Trabzon. During this period raiders were dispatched against Kemah and Bayburt. An Aq Qoyunlu lord who had entered Ottoman service, Ferruhşad Bey, took captive some of Shah Ismail’s men including his chief Emir Ahmed and brought them to Selim.

Sultan Selim assigned Bıyıklı Mehmet Pasha with the task of conquering Bayburt. Bıyıkli Mehmet Pasha conquered Bayburt which was defended by a Safavid chief, Kara Maksud. The attitude of Mehmet Pasha cause some of the guards around Kiği to be afraid, this area was also captured.

After his victory at Chaldiran Selim returned and received the news that the castles of Bayburt and Kiği had been conquered. He entrusted Bıyıkli Mehmet Pasha with the administration of the Erzincan-Bayburt province.

References

Battles involving the Ottoman Empire